The 1878–79 season was the eighth season of competitive football in England.

National team
For the first time, England played a team other than Scotland. England played both Scotland and Wales at Kennington Oval, London, beating Wales 2–1. This match was played in atrocious weather conditions with the team captains agreeing to play only 30 minutes in each half. England gained revenge on Scotland for the previous year's debacle by beating them 5–4.

Note – TheFa.com credits England's 4th (equalising) goal against Scotland as an own goal by the Scottish goalkeeper, Robert Parlane.

Honours

Notes = Number in parentheses is the times that club has won that honour. * indicates new record for competition

References

External links

Report on England v Scotland match on thefa.com